Matheus Isaías dos Santos (born 22 March 1996), known as Matheus Jussa or simply Jussa, is a Brazilian professional footballer who plays as a centre-back and defensive midfielder for Cruzeiro, on loan from Fortaleza.

Club career
Born in São Paulo, Jussa graduated from Portuguesa's youth categories, playing as an attacking midfielder or even as a forward. On 9 September 2014, he made his professional debut, replacing fellow youth graduate Gabriel Xavier in a 0–1 away loss against Santa Cruz for the Série B championship.

On 22 November 2014, Jussa scored his first goal, netting his side's only in a 1–2 away loss against Ceará. He moved back to the under-20s for the 2015 Copa São Paulo de Futebol Júnior, but later returned to the main squad.

On 26 April 2015, after staying four months unpaid, Jussa moved to Vasco da Gama on a free transfer; Portuguesa managed to retain 20% of his federative rights. Initially assigned back to the under-20s, he also featured with the reserves but never appeared for the main squad; during that period, he was converted into a defensive midfielder.

On 10 January 2017, after being above the maximum age to play for the under-20 side, Jussa moved to Bonsucesso on loan for the 2017 Campeonato Carioca. Roughly one year later, he was announced at São Bernardo after agreeing to a permanent deal.

On 10 April 2018, Jussa was loaned to Série C side Botafogo-SP, where he helped the club achieve promotion to the second division.

After subsequently returning to São Bernardo, Jussa joined Oeste ahead of the 2019 Série B. On 2 July 2020, after featuring regularly, he agreed to a one-year loan deal with Internacional in the top tier.

Career statistics

Honours
Fortaleza
Campeonato Cearense: 2021, 2022
Copa do Nordeste: 2022

References

External links

1996 births
Living people
People from Osasco
Brazilian footballers
Association football midfielders
Campeonato Brasileiro Série A players
Campeonato Brasileiro Série B players
Campeonato Brasileiro Série C players
Associação Portuguesa de Desportos players
CR Vasco da Gama players
Bonsucesso Futebol Clube players
São Bernardo Futebol Clube players
Botafogo Futebol Clube (SP) players
Oeste Futebol Clube players
Sport Club Internacional players
Fortaleza Esporte Clube players
Cruzeiro Esporte Clube players
Footballers from São Paulo (state)
Qatar SC players
Brazilian expatriate footballers
Expatriate footballers in Qatar
Brazilian expatriate sportspeople in Qatar